A waste pond or chemical pond is a small impounded water body used for the disposal of water pollutants, and sometimes utilized as a method of recycling or decomposing toxic substances.  Such waste ponds may be used for regular disposal of pollutant materials or may be used as upset receivers for special pollution events.  Often, chemical ponds themselves are addressed for cleanup action after their useful life is over or when a risk of groundwater contamination arises.  Peak usage of waste ponds in the United States occurred in the period 1955 to 1985, after which the environmental risks of pond technology were sufficiently understood, such that alternative technologies for waste disposal gradually began to displace many of the waste ponds.   Waste ponds often have pond liners, such as concrete or robust synthetic polymeric materials, to prevent infiltration of chemicals to soil or groundwater.

Examples

Piscataway chemical pond
One example of a chemical pond is situated in the woods of Piscataway, New Jersey. It was used by Union Carbide during the active phase of plant operation. Its main use was for drainage of chemicals. Hazardous and exotic chemicals would go down drains in the plant to the pond and later be pumped back to the factory via two large pumps. There it would be distilled to remove acetone and other hazardous chemicals from the mix. This process was overall harmful to the environment and polluted the groundwater.

Oak Ridge waste pond
The United States Oak Ridge National Laboratory operated for more than 50 years, performing research and production at its facility in the Melton Valley area of the Oak Ridge Reservation, in Oak Ridge, Tennessee, before it was decommissioned in the mid 1960s.  One of the results of this activity was a waste pond, which was contaminated with radioactive waste including strontium-90, caesium-137; tritium, and transuranics.
During the 1970s, the pond was backfilled with clay and shale, and finally capped with asphalt. 

In the mid 1990s, as a temporary solution to concerns that soil and sediments could migrate into nearby streams and, ultimately, reservoirs used for recreation and drinking water supplies, Department of Energy officials installed a cryogenic stabilization system at the waste pond, freezing the soil and groundwater to a depth of approximately  around the pond, thereby forming a barrier to groundwater leaching. 

In February 2004, the cryogenic system was dismantled, replaced with a temporary thermal foam blanket to keep the soil cold, and the pond was excavated.  The soil in the areas surrounding the frozen pond contained lower levels of contamination than the pond itself, but enough contamination that it had to be removed.  Approximately  of soil were removed from the surrounding areas. Another  of soil were excavated from the pond itself.

See also
Evaporation ponds
Waste stabilization pond

References

Environmental technology
Ponds
Water pollution